Group C of the 2019 FIBA Basketball World Cup was the group stage of the 2019 FIBA Basketball World Cup for the , ,  and . Each team played each other once, for a total of three games per team, with all games played at Guangzhou Gymnasium, Guangzhou. After all of the games were played, the top two teams with the best records qualified for the Second round and the bottom two teams played in the Classification Round.

Teams

Standings

Games
All times are local (UTC+8).

Iran vs. Puerto Rico
This was the first competitive game between Iran and Puerto Rico.

Spain vs. Tunisia
This was the first competitive game between Spain and Tunisia.

Tunisia vs. Iran
This was the second game in the World Cup between Tunisia and Iran. The Iranians won in 2010, which was also the last competitive game between the two teams.

Puerto Rico vs. Spain
This was the second game in the World Cup between Puerto Rico and Spain. The Puerto Ricans won in 2002, which was also the last competitive game between the two teams.

Puerto Rico vs. Tunisia
This was the first competitive game between Puerto Rico and Tunisia.

Spain vs. Iran
This was the second game in the World Cup between Spain and Iran. The Spaniards won in 2014, which was also the last competitive game between the two teams.

References

External links

2019 FIBA Basketball World Cup
2018–19 in Spanish basketball
2019 in Iranian sport
2019 in Puerto Rican sports